Anisostena is a genus of tortoise beetles and hispines in the family Chrysomelidae. There are at least 30 described species in Anisostena.

Species
These 30 species belong to the genus Anisostena:

 Anisostena angustata Pic, 1934
 Anisostena ariadne (Newman, 1841)
 Anisostena arizonica Schaeffer, 1933
 Anisostena bellula (Baly, 1864)
 Anisostena bicolor (J.Smith, 1885)
 Anisostena bicoloriceps Pic, 1928
 Anisostena bondari (Maulik, 1929)
 Anisostena breveapicalis Pic, 1934
 Anisostena californica Van Dyke, 1925
 Anisostena confusa Staines, 1994
 Anisostena cyanea Staines, 1994
 Anisostena cyanoptera (Suffrian, 1868)
 Anisostena daguerrei Uhmann, 1938
 Anisostena elegantula (Baly, 1864)
 Anisostena funesta (Baly, 1885)
 Anisostena gracilis (Horn, 1883)
 Anisostena kansana Schaeffer, 1933
 Anisostena lecontii (Baly, 1864)
 Anisostena missionensis Monrós & Viana, 1947
 Anisostena nigrita (Olivier, 1808)
 Anisostena nunenmacheri (Weise, 1907)
 Anisostena perspicua (Horn, 1883)
 Anisostena pilatei (Baly, 1864)
 Anisostena prompta Weise, 1910
 Anisostena scapularis Uhmann, 1964
 Anisostena suturalis (Weise, 1907)
 Anisostena texana Schaeffer, 1933
 Anisostena trilineata (Baly, 1864)
 Anisostena vittata Staines, 1994
 Anisostena warchalowskii Staines, 2007

References

Further reading

 
 
 
 
 
 

Cassidinae
Articles created by Qbugbot